Souleymane Doukara (born 29 September 1991) is a professional footballer who plays as a striker or a winger for TFF First League club Gençlerbirliği. He is nicknamed Dudu or The Duke. Born in France, he represents the Mauritania national team.

Club career

Early career
Doukara was born in Meudon, Hauts-de-Seine. He started his professional career during the 2008–09 season, playing for Rovigo Calcio in the Lega Pro Seconda Divisione. Making his first team debut at the age of 16 he played seven games that season, without scoring goals. Doukara was scouted by A.C. Milan who had an option to sign him from Rovigo, he even played for Milan's's youth team on a trial spell during a youth tournament in Milan, but the club decided against signing him. His club participated in the 2009–10 Serie D season and Doukara had his first chance to play as a regular starter; at the end of the championship he had made 36 appearances. His form earned him a trial spell at Grasshopper Club Zürich in the Swiss Super League but he was unable to earn a contract.

Prior to the 2011–12 Lega Pro season, Doukara was transferred to Seconda Divisione club Vibonese, in which he played 37 out of 42 league matches, scoring 13 goals.

Catania
After impressing scouts in the Italian fourth tier, Doukara officially signed with Serie A outfit, Calcio Catania. He made his Serie A debut on 16 September 2012, when he came on as a substitute for Alejandro Gómez against Fiorentina in a 2–0 loss after goals from Luca Toni and Stevan Jovetić. Doukara primarily served as a back-up to Argentine international's Gonzalo Bergessio and Maxi López, though he made 12 Serie A appearances in his maiden top flight season. Additionally, he made two Coppa Italia appearances that season in Catania's quarter-final run. Doukara failed to score for the Sicilian outfit in his debut season at the club.

On 1 September 2013, Doukara played in the 3–0 defeat of Catania by Serie A side Internazionale.

Loan to Juve Stabia
On 2 September, the last day of the transfer window, Doukara joined Serie B side Juve Stabia on loan. Subsequently, he scored six goals in 20 games during the 2013–14 season. However this wasn't enough to keep Juve Stabia in the division as they were relegated, finishing bottom.

Leeds United

2014–15
On 11 July 2014, it was confirmed by Leeds United owner Massimo Cellino that the club would sign him on season-long loan with the option for a permanent deal. On 12 July, Doukara's signing to Leeds was confirmed on the club's official Twitter page. On 1 August, Doukara was assigned the Leeds number 29 shirt for the 2014–15 season. Doukara made his debut for Leeds on 9 August against Millwall.

Doukara's first goal for Leeds United came on 12 August 2014, in a League Cup match against Accrington Stanley with fellow newcomer Gaetano Berardi getting the assist. He scored his second less than twenty minutes later to make it 2–0 to the home side.

However, on 16 August, Doukara tore his ankle ligaments in the 1–0 victory over Middlesbrough. The injury would rule him out for 4–5 weeks.

On 1 September 2014, Doukara's loan deal was made permanent, signing a three-year deal at the club. On 16 September 2014 he scored his first league goal for Leeds and his third in all competitions against Bournemouth in a 3–1 win. On 20 September, Doukara scored his fourth goal of the season and his first league goal at Elland Road in a 3–0 win over local rivals Huddersfield Town. Doukara scored his 5th goal of the season in a 1–1 draw against Norwich City, with teammate Adryan providing an assist. The same game saw him pick up a suspension for receiving his 5th yellow card of the season. Doukara returned from suspension and scored his 6th goal of the season against Blackpool in a 3–1 win on 8 November.

On 18 April 2015, Doukara was one of six Massimo Cellino signings (including Mirco Antenucci, Giuseppe Bellusci, Marco Silvestri, Dario Del Fabro and Edgar Çani) who controversially pulled out of the squad with an 'injury' the day before a 2–1 loss against Charlton Athletic.

On 2 May 2015, Doukara's strike against Blackpool was nominated for Leeds United's goal of the season at the end of the 2014–15 season awards ceremony, but lost out to eventual winner Rudy Austin's goal against Watford.

2015–16
On 31 July 2015, Doukara was given the number 11 shirt for the upcoming 2015–16 season. He scored against Rotherham United on 9 January 2016 in a 2–0 win to help Leeds advance to the fourth round of the FA Cup. He scored his fourth goal in five games in a 2–1 victory over Bolton Wanderers in the FA Cup on 30 January. On 31 March 2016, Doukara was banned for eight matches after biting Fernando Amorebieta during Leeds' home game with Fulham on 23 February 2016.

After being banned for eight matches, Doukara returned to the Leeds squad upon the expiry of his ban in the final game of the season in Leeds' 1–1 draw against Preston North End.

2016–17
Doukara made his first start of the season for Leeds on 23 August 2016, starting in Leeds' League Cup fixture against Luton Town. He came on as a substitute on 29 October 2016 against Burton Albion, making an immediate impact by winning the penalty scored by teammate Chris Wood which was followed by Doukara's first goal of the season to seal the game at 2–0 deep into stoppage time.

After reclaiming his place in the squad, becoming a regular on the Left Wing for Leeds, On 26 November, Doukara scored the winner for Leeds against Rotherham United in a 2–1 victory. On 9 December in a 2–0 defeat against Brighton & Hove Albion, Doukara was converted to an unfamiliar Central Midfield role due to injuries to Liam Bridcutt, Eunan O'Kane and the red card of Kalvin Phillips in the same game. He continued in the Central Midfield role, starting against Reading F.C. with Kalvin Phillips suspended, Doukara scored his third goal of the season in the same game in a 2–0 victory.

He scored his fourth of the season in a 4–1 victory against Preston North End on 26 December 2016.

On 25 January 2017, Doukara scored a powerful long range volley in a 2–0 win over Nottingham Forest with his first touch of the ball after coming on a substitute. Many drew comparisons of the goal to that of Leeds legend Tony Yeboah's famous volley against Liverpool.

On 30 April 2017, Doukara's volley against Nottingham Forest was named Goal Of The Season at Leeds United's end of season awards.

2017–18
After not featuring during the 2017–18 season under new Head Coach Thomas Christiansen, Doukara was set to start in Leeds' 5–1 EFL Cup victory against Newport County on 22 August, however Christiansen revealed that Doukara was in talks with a club so was dropped out of the lineup. On 23 August his contract with Leeds United was terminated by mutual consent.

Osmanlıspor
On the same day following his release from Leeds, he joined Turkish Süper Lig side Osmanlıspor on a two-year deal.

Antalyaspor
He joined fellow Turkish Süper Lig side Antalyaspor on 31 January 2018 for an undisclosed fee from Osmanlıspor. He scored 6 goals in his first 13 games for the club.

Ettifaq
On 22 August 2019, Al-Ettifaq has signed  Doukara for one seasons from Antalyaspor.

Giresunspor
On 31 March 2022, Turkish club Giresunspor unilaterally terminated their contract with Doukara for "the displays of joy and behavior contrary to the loyalty obligation" during a game against his earlier club Antalyaspor on 20 March.

Gençlerbirliği
In January 2023, Doukara returned to Turkey to join Gençlerbirliği on an eighteen-month contract, following a spell in Greece with Levadiakos.

International career
Doukara was born in France and is of Senegalese and Mauritanian descent. On 5 April 2014, he declared that he wanted to play for Senegal. He was called up to represent the Mauritania national team for the 2021 Africa Cup of Nations. He debuted with the Mauritania national team in a 0–0 friendly tie with Burkina Faso on 30 December 2021.

Style of play
Doukara plays as a striker but he can also play as a winger. He revealed in a 2013 interview that his favourite player was Nicolas Anelka due to his style of play.

Career statistics

Club

References

External links
 
 
 

1991 births
Living people
People from Meudon
Citizens of Mauritania through descent
Mauritanian footballers
Mauritania international footballers
French footballers
Mauritanian people of Senegalese descent
Sportspeople of Senegalese descent
French sportspeople of Senegalese descent
French sportspeople of Mauritanian descent
Association football wingers
Association football forwards
Serie A players
Serie B players
U.S. Vibonese Calcio players
Catania S.S.D. players
S.S. Juve Stabia players
Leeds United F.C. players
Ankaraspor footballers
Antalyaspor footballers
Ettifaq FC players
Giresunspor footballers
Levadiakos F.C. players
Gençlerbirliği S.K. footballers
Süper Lig players
Super League Greece players
Saudi Professional League players
2021 Africa Cup of Nations players
Expatriate footballers in Italy
Mauritanian expatriate footballers
French expatriate footballers
French expatriate sportspeople in Italy
Mauritanian expatriate sportspeople in Italy
Expatriate footballers in England
French expatriate sportspeople in England
Mauritanian expatriate sportspeople in England
Expatriate footballers in Turkey
French expatriate sportspeople in Turkey
Mauritanian expatriate sportspeople in Turkey
Expatriate footballers in Saudi Arabia
French expatriate sportspeople in Saudi Arabia
Mauritanian expatriate sportspeople in Saudi Arabia
Expatriate footballers in Greece
French expatriate sportspeople in Greece
Mauritanian expatriate sportspeople in Greece
Footballers from Hauts-de-Seine